The 1917–18 South Carolina men's basketball team represents University of South Carolina during the 1917–18 college men's basketball season. The team finished with an overall record of 8–5.

Schedule

|-

References

South Carolina Gamecocks men's basketball seasons
South Carolina
South Carolina Gamecocks men's basketball
South Carolina Gamecocks men's basketball